My Teenage Wedding is a Canadian reality television series broadcast on Slice. Viewers follow producers "behind the scenes of Canada's teen weddings, following teenage couples as they leap headfirst into a very adult world of matrimony. When the big day approaches, the teen brides-and-grooms-to-be soon come to realize that marriage isn't as simple as saying 'I do'." The show premiered on May 31, 2012 and covers the weddings of teenagers from various different lifestyles. The first season had twelve episodes and concluded on January 31, 2013. Hashtag Gay Wedding received attention for being about same sex marriage. The couple in the episode, David Harris and Tre'Darrius Anderson, was described as possibly being "America's youngest black gay married couple."

"Everyone thinks they're too young to get married, but they don't care! Convinced that their love is forever, these teens will stop at nothing to walk down the aisle." "From touching moments, to outrageous meltdowns, this exciting...series follows their journey from teenage romance to grown up commitment as they discover that it's a bumpy road to happily ever after."

Episodes

Season 1
 "Teen Moroccan Matrimony" episode 1, (aired 31 May 2012).

 "Young, Crazy and in Love" episode 2, (aired 31 May 2012).

 "Teenage Wedding on a Budget" episode 3, (aired 31 May 2012).

 "Family Ties and Tying the Knot" episode 4, (aired 31 May 2012).

Season 2
1 "Bride vs. Bro" episode 1, (aired 31 January 2013).

2 "Shotgun Wedding" episode 2, (aired 31 January 2013).

3 "Best Frenemies" episode 3, (aired 8 February 2013).

 "Tantrums and Tulle" episode 4, (aired 8 February 2013).

 "Teen Dreamers" episode 5, (aired 22 February 2013).

 "Suck It Up, Buttercup" episode 6, (aired 22 February 2013).

 "Groom Meets Gown" episode 7, (aired 1 March 2013).

 "Ahead of The Game" episode 8, (aired 1 March 2013).

 "Web of Love" episode 9, (aired 8 March 2013). 

 "Hashtag Gay Wedding" episode 10, (aired 8 March 2013).

 "Off 2 Get Hitched" episode 11, (aired 28 March 2013).

 "Runaway Bride" episode 12, (aired 28 March 2013).

References

External links
 

2010s Canadian reality television series
Television series by Cineflix
2012 Canadian television series debuts
Slice (TV channel) original programming
Wedding television shows
2013 Canadian television series endings
Canadian dating and relationship reality television series